The Logtown Plantation is a Southern plantation with a historic house located in Monroe, Louisiana, USA. The house was designed in the Federal architectural style. It has been listed on the National Register of Historic Places since October 16, 1980.

References

Plantations in Louisiana
Houses in Ouachita Parish, Louisiana
Federal architecture in Louisiana
Houses on the National Register of Historic Places in Louisiana
National Register of Historic Places in Ouachita Parish, Louisiana
1840 establishments in Louisiana